Aliabad-e Takeh (also Romanized as ‘Alīābād-e Taḵeh; also known as ‘Alīābād) is a village in Rivand Rural District, in the Central District of Nishapur County, Razavi Khorasan Province, Iran. At the 2006 census, its population was 20, in 5 families.

See also 

 List of cities, towns and villages in Razavi Khorasan Province

References 

Populated places in Nishapur County